Sandoll Communications Inc. (pronounced [sʰa̠nto̞ːɭ kʰʌ̹mjunikʰe̞iɕʰʌ̹n]), commonly known as Sandoll, is a South Korean type foundry.  It is mainly known for designing the typefaces Malgun Gothic for Microsoft, Nanum for Naver, and Apple SD Gothic Neo for Apple. The company was founded in 1984.

References 

1984 establishments in South Korea
Companies based in Seoul
Type foundries